Events in the year 2002 in Spain.

Incumbents
 Monarch: Juan Carlos I
 Prime Minister: José María Aznar López

Events

Arts and entertainment

Sports
 2001–02 La Liga
 2001–02 Segunda División
 2001–02 Copa del Rey
 2002 Vuelta a España

Births

 April 30: Miguel Urdangarín y de Borbón, third son of Infanta Cristina of Spain and Iñaki Urdangarín

Deaths
Camilo José Cela, 85, Spanish novelist, poet,  and essayist, 1989 Nobel Prize in Literature.
Ramón Grosso, 58, Spanish footballer, cancer.
Carlos Casares Mouriño, 60, Spanish Galician language writer, cardiac arrest.
Xavier Montsalvatge, 90, Spanish composer and music critic.
Carlos Berlanga, 42, Spanish musician and painter.
Carmelo Bernaola, 72, Spanish composer and clarinetist.
Jaime Brocal Remohí, 66, Spanish comic book artist.
Pedro Alberto Cano Arenas, 33, Spanish footballer, cerebral hemorrhage.
Eduardo Chillida, 78, Spanish Basque sculptor.
Ricardo Calvo, 58, Spanish chess International Master, doctor, chess historian, author and reporter.
Infanta Beatriz of Spain, 93, Spanish noblewoman and daughter of King Alfonso XIII.

See also
 2002 in Spanish television
 List of Spanish films of 2002

References

 
Spain
Years of the 21st century in Spain
2000s in Spain
Spain